Pamela A. Raymond is an American biologist. She is the Stephen S. Easter Collegiate Professor Emerita at University of Michigan College of Literature, Science, and the Arts.

Education 
Raymond earned a B.S., M.S., and Ph.D. from University of Michigan.

Career 
Raymond was a faculty member at Harvard Medical School and Michigan Medicine. She was a visiting professor at University of Lausanne, University of Utah, and University of California, San Francisco. Raymond was a professor of molecular, cellular, and developmental biology at University of Michigan College of Literature, Science, and the Arts. Raymond's lab investigated the molecular bases of cell signaling regulating retina neurogenesis and neuronal specificity. Her lab uses zebrafish as a genetic model to research retinal stem cells. From 1997 to 2002, Raymond was the associate provost for academic and faculty affairs at University of Michigan. Raymond retired on July 1, 2017. Post-retirement, Raymond is an advocate for equality, diversity, and outreach in STEM. She is the Stephen S. Easter Collegiate Professor Emerita.

References

External links 
 

Year of birth missing (living people)
Living people
Place of birth missing (living people)
University of Michigan faculty
20th-century American women scientists
21st-century American women scientists
20th-century American biologists
21st-century American biologists
American women biologists
Harvard Medical School faculty
University of Michigan alumni
American women academics